Agler–La Follette House is a historic house in Mifflin Township near Columbus, Ohio. It was added to the National Register of Historic Places on December 14, 1978.

Historic uses 
The home was originally built around 1824 for Frederick Agler who, with his family, was one of the first settlers to Mifflin Township in 1806. Agler would rise to prominence in the local community and later be elected Mifflin Township Justice of the Peace in 1811.

References 

Houses on the National Register of Historic Places in Ohio
Houses in Franklin County, Ohio
National Register of Historic Places in Franklin County, Ohio
Federal architecture in Ohio